The 2018–19 Football League is the second division of the Greek professional football league system and the eighth season under the name Football League after previously being known as Beta Ethniki. This year the participating teams were reduced from 18 to 16.

Team changes
The following teams have changed division since the 2017–18 season.

Stadiums

 1 Aittitos Spata was expelled during the season

Personnel and sponsoring

League table

Results

Top scorers

References

2
Second level Greek football league seasons
Greece